Eustala is a genus of orb-weaver spiders first described by Eugène Simon in 1895.

Species
 it contains eighty-six species:
E. albiventer (Keyserling, 1884) – Brazil
E. anastera (Walckenaer, 1841) – North, Central America
E. bacelarae Caporiacco, 1955 – Venezuela
E. banksi Chickering, 1955 – Mexico, Costa Rica
E. belissima Poeta, Marques & Buckup, 2010 – Brazil, Uruguay
E. bifida F. O. Pickard-Cambridge, 1904 – USA to Panama
E. bisetosa Bryant, 1945 – Hispaniola
E. brevispina Gertsch & Davis, 1936 – USA, Mexico
E. bucolica Chickering, 1955 – Panama
E. californiensis (Keyserling, 1885) – USA, Mexico
E. cameronensis Gertsch & Davis, 1936 – USA
E. catarina Poeta, 2014 – Brazil
E. cazieri Levi, 1977 – USA, Bahama Is.
E. cepina (Walckenaer, 1841) – North America
E. cidae Poeta, 2014 – Brazil
E. clavispina (O. Pickard-Cambridge, 1889) – USA to El Salvador
E. conchlea (McCook, 1888) – USA, Mexico
E. conformans Chamberlin, 1925 – Panama
E. crista Poeta, Marques & Buckup, 2010 – Brazil
E. cuia Poeta, 2014 – Brazil
E. delasmata Bryant, 1945 – Mexico, Dominican Rep.
E. delecta Chickering, 1955 – Panama
E. devia (Gertsch & Mulaik, 1936) – USA to Panama, Caribbean
E. eldorado Poeta, 2014 – Brazil
E. eleuthera Levi, 1977 – USA, Bahama Is., Jamaica
E. emertoni (Banks, 1904) – USA, Mexico
E. ericae Poeta, 2014 – Brazil
E. exigua Chickering, 1955 – Panama
E. farroupilha Poeta, 2014 – Brazil
E. fragilis (O. Pickard-Cambridge, 1889) – Guatemala, Panama
E. fuscovittata (Keyserling, 1864) – Mexico, Cuba to South America
E. gonygaster (C. L. Koch, 1838) – Brazil, Guyana
E. guarani Poeta, 2014 – Brazil
E. guianensis (Taczanowski, 1873) – Peru, French Guiana
E. guttata F. O. Pickard-Cambridge, 1904 – Mexico to Brazil
E. histrio Mello-Leitão, 1948 – Panama, Guyana
E. illicita (O. Pickard-Cambridge, 1889) – Mexico to Brazil
E. inconstans Chickering, 1955 – Panama
E. ingenua Chickering, 1955 – Guatemala to Panama
E. innoxia Chickering, 1955 – Panama
E. itapocuensis Strand, 1916 – Brazil
E. lata Chickering, 1955 – Panama
E. latebricola (O. Pickard-Cambridge, 1889) – Guatemala to Panama
E. levii Poeta, Marques & Buckup, 2010 – Brazil
E. lisei Poeta, 2014 – Brazil, Uruguay
E. lunulifera Mello-Leitão, 1939 – French Guiana, Guyana
E. maxima Chickering, 1955 – Panama
E. meridionalis Baert, 2014 – Ecuador (Galapagos Is.)
E. mimica Chickering, 1955 – Panama
E. minuscula (Keyserling, 1892) – Brazil
E. monticola Chamberlin, 1916 – Peru
E. montivaga Chickering, 1955 – Panama
E. mourei Mello-Leitão, 1947 – Brazil
E. mucronatella (Roewer, 1942) – Brazil
E. nasuta Mello-Leitão, 1939 – Panama, Guyana, Brazil
E. novemmamillata Mello-Leitão, 1941 – Argentina
E. oblonga Chickering, 1955 – Panama
E. occidentalis Baert, 2014 – Ecuador (Galapagos Is.)
E. orientalis Baert, 2014 – Ecuador (Galapagos Is.)
E. pallida Mello-Leitão, 1940 – Brazil
E. palmares Poeta, Marques & Buckup, 2010 – Brazil, Uruguay, Argentina
E. perdita Bryant, 1945 – Hispaniola
E. perfida Mello-Leitão, 1947 – Brazil, Uruguay
E. photographica Mello-Leitão, 1944 – Brazil, Uruguay, Argentina
E. redundans Chickering, 1955 – Panama
E. rosae Chamberlin & Ivie, 1935 – USA, Mexico
E. rubroguttulata (Keyserling, 1879) – Peru
E. rustica Chickering, 1955 – Panama
E. saga (Keyserling, 1893) – Brazil, Uruguay
E. sagana (Keyserling, 1893) – Brazil
E. scitula Chickering, 1955 – Mexico to Panama
E. scutigera (O. Pickard-Cambridge, 1898) – Mexico to Panama
E. secta Mello-Leitão, 1945 – Brazil, Argentina
E. sedula Chickering, 1955 – Panama
E. semifoliata (O. Pickard-Cambridge, 1899) – Central America
E. smaragdinea (Taczanowski, 1878) – Peru
E. tantula Chickering, 1955 – Panama
E. taquara (Keyserling, 1892) – Brazil, Uruguay, Argentina
E. tribrachiata Badcock, 1932 – Paraguay
E. trinitatis (Hogg, 1918) – Trinidad
E. ulecebrosa (Keyserling, 1892) – Brazil, Argentina
E. unimaculata Franganillo, 1930 – Cuba
E. vegeta (Keyserling, 1865) – Mexico to Brazil, Hispaniola
E. vellardi Mello-Leitão, 1924 – Brazil, Paraguay
E. viridipedata (Roewer, 1942) – Peru
E. wiedenmeyeri Schenkel, 1953 – Venezuela

References

Araneidae
Araneomorphae genera
Taxa named by Eugène Simon